Rannapungerja River is a river in Ida-Viru County, Estonia. The river is 63 km long and basin size is 594.6 km2. It runs into Peipus Lake.

Trouts and Thymallus thymallus live also in the river.

References

Rivers of Estonia
Ida-Viru County